Mustafa Kamel Mansour  (2 August 1914 – 24 July 2002) was an Egyptian footballer who played as a goalkeeper for Egypt at the 1934 FIFA World Cup. He is also notable for being one of the first non-British or Irish players to play in the Scottish leagues.

Playing career
Born in Cairo, Egypt, Mansour played for Cairo-based club Al Ahly in his native country, where his performances earned him a selection for the 1934 World Cup in Italy. He played in Egypt's only game at the tournament, a 4–2 defeat to Hungary in the first round in Naples.

Mansour also played for Egypt at the 1936 Summer Olympics in Berlin.

Egypt's coach at the World Cup had been a Scotsman, James McCrae, and he may have influenced Mansour's decision to move to Scotland in 1936 to attend Jordanhill College alongside Mohamed Latif. While studying in Glasgow, Mansour appeared for the famous amateur side Queens Park, becoming their regular goalkeeper upon the retirement of Desmond White (future chairman of Celtic) during the 1938–39 season.

Coaching career and later life
In the late thirties, "Tuffy" Mansour as he was known, was a popular adult leader in the 72nd Glasgow Scout Troop.

Mansour returned to Egypt when the Second World War broke out, where he would later manage former club Al Ahly, as well as become a government minister.

He died in July 2002, a month before what would have been his 88th birthday. Only weeks before his death, he had given an interview to BBC Sport on their visit to Cairo in the run-up to the World Cup being held in Japan and South Korea that summer.

References

1914 births
2002 deaths
Association football goalkeepers
Egyptian footballers
Al Ahly SC players
Egypt international footballers
Queen's Park F.C. players
Egyptian football managers
1934 FIFA World Cup players
Olympic footballers of Egypt
Footballers at the 1936 Summer Olympics
Egyptian expatriate footballers
Expatriate footballers in Scotland
Al Ahly SC managers
Government ministers of Egypt
Egyptian sportsperson-politicians
Scottish Football League players
Egyptian expatriate sportspeople in the United Kingdom